Mailly-le-Château is a commune in the Yonne department in Bourgogne-Franche-Comté in north-central France.
The lower village is on the left bank of the river Yonne, adjacent to the Canal du Nivernais. The upper village is noted for its 14th-century fortified castle and the 13th-century church of St Adrian.

See also
Communes of the Yonne department

References

Gallery

Communes of Yonne